Sweety was a Taiwanese musical duo formed by Esther Liu (colloquially known as Yan Yan (言言) ; born August 8, 1988) and Joanne Tseng (colloquially known as Qiao Qiao (喬喬); born November 17, 1988). The duo were formed in 2002 and debuted in 2003 at the age of 14.

Sweety were active from 2003 to 2006 and has released 3 studio albums and 2 soundtracks. They went on hiatus as a group since 2007 when Liu went to Paris to study for a few years, while Tseng continued with her solo career.

Apart from singing, both members have also acted in films and television series.

Discography

Studio albums

Soundtracks

References

External links

Living people
Taiwanese girl groups
1988 births
Taiwanese musical duos
Musical groups established in 2003
Musical groups disestablished in 2006
21st-century Taiwanese singers
21st-century Taiwanese women singers